Alban Dragusha (born 11 December 1981) is a Kosovar football retired defender.

Playing career

Club
Born in Pristina (formerly in SFR Yugoslavia, now Kosovo), during his career he represented Kosovar clubs such as KF KEK, KF Kosova Prishtinë and KF Trepça, and also numerous clubs abroad, such as Ukrainian FC Vorskla Poltava, Azerbeijani FK Baku, Albanian clubs Besa Kavajë and Skënderbeu Korçë, and Swedish side Kalmar FF.

While playing with Besa Kavajë, he was suspended for two years after being taken for doping after a match against a Serbian team FK Bežanija in the UEFA Cup on 19 July 2007. Later, he re-signed for Besa Kavajë after he was released from the contract with KF Trepça. He has won the National Cup with Besa Kavajë.

International
He was part of the team representing Kosovo in 2005.

Honours

'Besa '
 Albanian Cup (1): 2009–10

Notes

References

External links
 

1981 births
Living people
Sportspeople from Pristina
Kosovo Albanians
Association football defenders
Kosovan footballers
Yugoslav footballers
KF KEK players
KF Kosova Prishtinë players
FC Vorskla Poltava players
FC Baku players
Besa Kavajë players
KF Trepça players
KF Skënderbeu Korçë players
Kalmar FF players
KF Vushtrria players
FC Drita players
Kosovan expatriate footballers
Expatriate footballers in Ukraine
Kosovan expatriate sportspeople in Ukraine
Expatriate footballers in Azerbaijan
Kosovan expatriate sportspeople in Azerbaijan
Expatriate footballers in Albania
Kosovan expatriate sportspeople in Albania
Expatriate footballers in Sweden
Kosovan expatriate sportspeople in Sweden
Doping cases in association football
Kosovan football managers
KF KEK managers